Rubus azuayensis is a species of plant in the family Rosaceae. It is endemic to Ecuador.

References

Endemic flora of Ecuador
azuayensis
Vulnerable plants
Taxonomy articles created by Polbot